John Yeamans (c.1735 – 1824) was a political figure in New Brunswick. He represented Queen's in the Legislative Assembly of New Brunswick from 1786 to 1816.

He came to New Brunswick from Dutchess County, New York in 1783. Yeamans served as a magistrate for Queen's County until his death at the age of 89.

References 
 

Year of birth uncertain
1824 deaths
People from Dutchess County, New York
Members of the Legislative Assembly of New Brunswick
Colony of New Brunswick people
United Empire Loyalists
American emigrants to pre-Confederation New Brunswick